Rob Stewart (born 23 July 1961) is a Canadian actor born in Toronto, Ontario, Canada, known for the lead role of Nick Slaughter in the action-comedy television series Tropical Heat, and his recurring roles as Roan in Nikita and Khlyen in Killjoys.

Early life
Stewart was raised in Bramalea, a neighbourhood in the city of Brampton. He enjoyed playing hockey and dreamt of becoming a professional. At the age of 17, he sustained an injury that caused him to lose a kidney and subsequently turn down a number of athletic scholarships that had been offered to him.

He enrolled at the University of Waterloo where he majored in Latin and English. In order to put himself through university, he sang and played the guitar at local restaurants. In the summers, he did stunts and acrobatics at Canada's Wonderland amusement park.

Career
Throughout his career he has guest starred in numerous television roles. One of his early notable roles was Nick Slaughter on Tropical Heat. Stewart was one of the leads in the television show Peter Benchley's Amazon. In 2007 he began playing the male lead in Painkiller Jane that ran for twenty two episodes on the Sci Fi Channel.

Stewart played a major recurring character, Roan, in the CW hit action television series Nikita for its first two seasons. Towards the end of his run on Nikita he also had a minor role of an alcoholic movie producer over a few episodes of the Canadian series The L.A. Complex that depicts the lives of young Canadian actors struggling for work in Los Angeles. This was followed by an appearance in two episodes of the long-running CBC Television series Heartland.

Airing on the CW, he appeared in six episodes of Beauty & the Beast as the character Mr. Chandler. Soon after, Stewart appeared in an episode of the Syfy television series Defiance which was shot in his hometown Toronto, followed by another one-episode role – this time on the Canadian series Cracked.

In 2013, the documentary entitled Slaughter Nick for President was released. The film follows Stewart on his 2009 trip to Serbia, where Tropical Heat achieved notable popularity in the 1990s. The same year, he was cast in Suits as corporate raider Tony Gionopoulos, appearing in 5 episodes.

From 2015 to 2019, Stewart played Khlyen, a significant recurring character in Killjoys.<ref>{{cite web|title=Unconditional Love - Interview with Killjoys''' Rob Stewart|url=http://scifiandtvtalk.typepad.com/scifiandtvtalk/2016/07/unconditional-love-interview-with-killjoys-rob-stewart.html|website=SciFiAndTvTalk|accessdate=15 October 2016}}</ref>

Personal life
Stewart met his wife Celiana Stewart in Mexico during the first season of Tropical Heat''. He has one son. Since 2001, he has resided in Canada.

Select filmography

Film

Television

References

External links

1961 births
Living people
Canadian male film actors
Canadian male television actors
20th-century Canadian male actors
21st-century Canadian male actors